
The following lists events that happened during 1826 in South Africa.

Events
  Governor Charles Somerset leaves the Cape Colony under a cloud of bad feelings
 Adam Kok II establishes Philippolis
 The Dutch Reformed Church congregations are established in Clanwilliam, Colesberg, Durbanville and Tijgerberg

References
See Years in South Africa for list of References

 
South Africa
Years in South Africa